Sergio Andrés Felipe Silva (born February 21, 1991) is an Uruguayan footballer who plays as a defender for Chilean club Rangers de Talca.

Career

As a youth player, Felipe's quit competitive football until his brother recovered from a coma.

For 2020, he signed for Chilean side Palestino from Danubio in the Uruguayan top flight. After, he joined Primera B club Coquimbo Unido for 2021 season.

Honours
Coquimbo Unido
 Primera B (1): 2021

References

External links
 Sergio Felipe at Soccerway

Living people
1991 births
Footballers from Montevideo
Uruguayan footballers
Association football defenders
La Luz F.C. players
El Tanque Sisley players
Villa Española players
Sud América players
Danubio F.C. players
Club Deportivo Palestino footballers
Coquimbo Unido footballers
Rangers de Talca footballers
Uruguayan expatriate sportspeople in Chile
Expatriate footballers in Chile
Uruguayan Primera División players
Uruguayan Segunda División players
Chilean Primera División players
Primera B de Chile players